In molecular biology, U105 belongs to the C/D family of snoRNAs. It is encoded in an intron of the Peter pan homolog gene and is predicted to guide 2'O-ribose methylation of residue U799 of the small 18S rRNA subunit.

References

External links 
 
 snoRNABase page for Small nucleolar RNA SNORD105

Small nuclear RNA